Lušci Palanka is a village in the municipality of Sanski Most, Federation of Bosnia and Herzegovina, Bosnia and Herzegovina.

Demographics 
According to the 2013 census, its population was 226.

References

Populated places in Sanski Most
Villages in the Federation of Bosnia and Herzegovina